A list of films directed by Yakov Protazanov.

External links
 

Protazanov, Yakov